Cycas lindstromii is a species of cycad endemic to southern Vietnam. It is found in Ba Ria-Vung Tau, Binh Thuan, Khanh Hoa, and Ninh Thuan provinces, Vietnam.

References

lindstromii